Located in Suncheon, Jeonnam in South Korea, Suncheon Bay is a coastal wetland, composed of a  long stream, a  wide tideland and a  wide field of reeds. Due to its natural coast, it is the habitat of migratory birds and plants and animals. It is the first Korean coastal wetland, Suncheon Bay Ecological Park, to be registered on the list of The Ramsar Wetland on January 20, 2006.

Characteristics 
Suncheon Bay's wide tideland, field of reeds, and salt swamp have their natural scenes undamaged. Salt swamp has a function in water pollution prevention and purification, keeping Suncheon Bay clean and undamaged. The shallow tideland at the river mouth has reasonable salt content, abundant organisms, and a healthy water quality. These characteristics make Suncheon Bay a spawning ground for fish, crab, shellfish, etc.

Organisms 
Animals hypothetically present
Otter (Lutra lutra)
Small-eared cat (Felis bengalensis manchurica)
Raccoon dog (Nyctereutes procyonoides)
Weasel (Mustela sibirica coreana)

Birds
Hooded crane (Grus monacha)
Eurasian spoonbill (Platalea leucorodia)
Whooper swan (Cygnus cygnus)
Chinese egret (Egretta eulophotes)

Plants
Reed (Phragmites communis)
Aster tripolium
Plantago major for. yezomaritima

References

External links

 Homepage of Suncheon Bay 
 Korea Tourism Organization Information Page  
 Ramsar Sites Information Service 

Landforms of South Jeolla Province
Ramsar sites in South Korea
Suncheon